Ingrid Landmark Tandrevold (born 23 September 1996) is a Norwegian biathlete who competed for Norway at the 2018 Winter Olympics. She represents the club Fossum IF.

Biathlon results
All results are sourced from the International Biathlon Union.

Olympic Games
0 medal

World Championships
8 medals (4 gold, 3 silver, 1 bronze)

*During Olympic seasons competitions are only held for those events not included in the Olympic program.

Junior World Championships

World Cup

World cup Individual Podiums
 1 victories – (1 MS)

References

External links

1996 births
Living people
Sportspeople from Bærum
Norwegian female biathletes
Olympic biathletes of Norway
Biathletes at the 2018 Winter Olympics
Biathletes at the 2022 Winter Olympics
Biathlon World Championships medalists
21st-century Norwegian women